State Paper Office may refer to 

Public Record Office, UK
National Archives of Ireland, Republic of Ireland